George Stephenson Elliott  (1 June 1885 – 25 September 1917) was an Australian rules footballer who played with University and Fitzroy in the Victorian Football League (VFL).

Family
The son of Thomas Elliott (1831-1911), and his wife Helen Elliott (1849-1933), née Janvrin, and the brother of AIF General Harold "Pompey" Elliott (1878-1931), and cousin of Admiral Sir Francis William Loftus Tottenham,  George Stephenson Elliott was born at Charlton, Victoria on 1 June 1885. He married Alice Evelyn "Lyn" Walker on 30 October 1915; and they had a daughter, Jacquelyn Edmee (1916-1963), who later married John Edwin Fellows (1919-1995).

Education
He was educated at Ballarat College and the University of Melbourne, and took a leading part in sport with both Ormond College and the University. He studied medicine, and graduated M.B.B.S. in September 1915.

Football
A defender, Elliott played one game for Fitzroy in 1905 before becoming a member of the inaugural University side when they joined the league in 1908. He captained the club in 1911 and 1912.

Military service
Elliott was killed in World War I at the Menin Road Ridge, having previously been awarded the Military Cross for gallantry.

See also
 List of Victorian Football League players who died in active service

Footnotes

References
 
 First World War Service Record Captain George Stephenson Elliott, National Archives of Australia.
 Australian War Memorial Roll of Honour: Captain George Stephenson Elliott MC
 The grave of Captain George Stephenson Elliott, Australian Army Medical Corps, Collection of the Australian War Memorial.

External links

 
 
 George Elliott: Boyles Football Photos.

1885 births
1917 deaths
Australian rules footballers from Victoria (Australia)
University Football Club players
Fitzroy Football Club players
Australian military personnel killed in World War I
Australian Army officers
Australian recipients of the Military Cross
Federation University Australia alumni
People from Charlton, Victoria